The 1927 local elections in Zagreb were held on 4 September, 7 days before the parliamentary elections. The Croatian Bloc coalition won a majority in the City Assembly and reelected Vjekoslav Heinzel as mayor.

Results

The Croatian Bloc, a coalition consisting of the Croatian Federalist Peasant Party and Croatian Party of Rights, won 50% of the votes and 25 seats in the City Assembly. The Republican Alliance of Workers and Peasants, a party list formed by the banned Communist Party, came second with 12.59% of the votes. Vjekoslav Heinzel was reelected mayor in his last term. The 1927 local elections were the last ones before the 6 January Dictatorship when King Alexander I banned all political parties.

Election posters

References

See also
List of mayors of Zagreb
1927 Kingdom of Serbs, Croats and Slovenes parliamentary election

Zagreb 1927-09
Elections in Zagreb
Zagreb 1927-09
Zagreb 1927-09
Zagreb local election
Local election 1927-09
Zagreb local election